Bolero is a Cuban genre of song developed in the late 19th century.

Bolero may also refer to:

Music and dance 
 Bolero (Spanish dance), a 3/4 dance that originated in Spain in the late 18th century
 Boléro (Chopin), an 1834 piano work
 Boléro, an orchestral work by Maurice Ravel, originally commissioned as a ballet score by danseuse Ida Rubinstein which premiered in 1928
 Boléro, choreography by Bronislava Nijinska, designs by Alexandre Benois, Ida Rubinstein Ballet (Paris Opéra, 1928) 
 Boléro, choreographed by Maurice Béjart, Ballet of the 20th Century (La Monnaie, 1961)  
 B/olero, choreographed by Ohad Naharin, Batsheva Dance Company

Albums
 Boleros (Tete Montoliu album), 1977
 Bolero (Mr. Children album), 1997
 Boleros (Juan Gabriel album), 2010
 Bolero, an album by Stanley Jordan, 1994
 Bolero, an album by Isao Tomita, 2008
 Boléro (Larry Coryell album), 1981
 Boleros, an album by José Cura
 Bolero (Haustor album), 1985

Songs
 "Bolero - A Peacock's Tale", an instrumental portion of the King Crimson song "Lizard" featured on the 1971 album of the same name
 "Bolero", a 1980s pop song by German singer Fancy
 "Bolero / Kiss the Baby Sky / Wasurenaide", a 2009 CD single by Tohoshinki
 "Bolero", a song composed and interpreted by Italian singer Claudio Baglioni
 "Beck's Bolero", a rock instrumental composition recorded by English guitarist Jeff Beck in 1966

Film 
 Bolero (1934 film), a film starring George Raft and Carole Lombard
 Bolero (1942 film), a French comedy film directed by Jean Boyer
 Bolero (1984 film), a film directed by John Derek
 Bolero, a 1990 video-art film by Sabri Kaliç
 Bolero, a 1992 short animation film by Ivan Maximov
 Bolero, U.S. title of the 1981 French film Les Uns et les Autres 
 The Bolero, a 1973 short documentary film

Transportation 
 Mahindra Bolero, a line of SUVs produced by Indian company Mahindra & Mahindra Limited
 SEAT Bolero, a concept car from SEAT, shown in 1998
 , a Romanian ferry in service 1996–2000
 Gin Bolero Plus, a South Korean paraglider design

Other uses 
 Bolero jacket, a short jacket with long sleeves, also known as a "shrug"
 Bolero (horse), a dressage horse and notable sire
 Bolero, an Image Comics publication
 Bolero (magazine), published by Ringier in Switzerland
 Operation Bolero, codename for the World War II American troop buildup in the United Kingdom in preparation for D-Day

See also 
 Balero, a cup-and-ball game